Lars Lunde (born 21 March 1964) is a Danish former professional football player, who played in the striker position. Lunde got his breakthrough with Brøndby IF in 1983, and he made his debut for the Denmark national football team in October 1983. He was sold to Young Boys Bern in Switzerland, before moving to German club Bayern Munich in 1986. He was a part of the Bayern team which won the German Bundesliga championship in 1987, and he came on as a late substitute when Bayern lost the 1987 European Cup Final to FC Porto. He played the last of his three matches for the Danish national team in April 1987, before leaving Bayern during the 1987–88 season. He went on to play for a number of smaller clubs, ending his career with FC Baden in Switzerland.

Honours
Young Boys Bern
 Swiss League: 1985–86
 Swiss Super Cup: 1986

Bayern Munich
 Bundesliga: 1986–87

Individual
 Swiss Foreign Footballer of the Year: 1985–86

References

External links
Danish national team profile 

1964 births
Living people
Danish expatriate sportspeople in West Germany
Danish men's footballers
Danish expatriate men's footballers
Brøndby IF players
BSC Young Boys players
FC Aarau players
FC Baden players
Expatriate footballers in Switzerland
FC Bayern Munich footballers
Denmark international footballers
Denmark under-21 international footballers
Bundesliga players
Association football forwards
People from Nyborg
Sportspeople from the Region of Southern Denmark
Expatriate footballers in West Germany
Danish expatriate sportspeople in Switzerland